The Hadrami or Hadhrami Sheikdom, Maktab Al Hadharem, or Al Hadharem, is one of the five sheikdoms of Upper Yafa. The Hadrami sheikdom was divided into four quarters: Sinaani (سناني), Bal Hay (بلحأي), Thuluthi (ثلثي), and Marfadi (مرفدي). The capital of the sheikdom is the village of Al-Shibr, which is located in the Sinaani quarter.

History
The state was abolished on 14 August 1967 upon the founding of the People's Republic of Yemen. In 1990 it became part of the Republic of Yemen.

Rulers
Hadrami was ruled by sheikhs who bore the title Shaykh al-Mashyakha al-Hadramiyya.

Sheikhs
1820 - 1850                Ghalib al-Hadrami 
1850 - 1870                Muhammad ibn Ghalib al-Hadrami 
1870 - 1900                Muhsin ibn Ghalib al-Hadrami 
1900 - 1915                Muhsin ibn Muhsin al-Hadrami 
1915 - 1945                Nasi ibn Muhsin al-Hadrami 
1945 - 1958                Muhammad ibn Muhsin al Hadrami 
1959                       `Abd Allah ibn Muhammad al-Hadrami 
1959 - 1967                `Abd al-Qawi ibn Muhammad al-Hadrami

See also
Aden Protectorate
Upper Yafa

References

External links
Map of Arabia (1905-1923) including the states of Aden Protectorate 

History of Yemen
Former countries
Former monarchies

ar:الحضارم
ca:Hadrami